Platevindex luteus is a species of air-breathing sea slug, a shell-less marine pulmonate gastropod mollusk in the family Onchidiidae.

Description 
The notum of the slug is bumpy with prominent papillae. The species has dorsal photoreceptors ("dorsal eyes"), although these may not always be visible.

Distribution 
Australia: Queensland. Brunei. Indonesia: Ambon, Bali, Halmahera, Kei Islands, Lombok, Seram, Sulawesi, Sumatra, Ternate and Timor. Papua New Guinea: New Britain, New Ireland and Madang. Philippines: Bohol and Luzon. Singapore. Vietnam.

References 

Onchidiidae
Gastropods described in 1885